Tut-e Nadeh (also Romanized as Tūt-e Nadeh and Tūt Nadeh) is a village in Tut-e Nadeh Rural District, in the Central District of Dana County, Kohgiluyeh and Boyer-Ahmad Province, Iran. At the 2006 census, its population was 1,600, in 353 families.

References 

Populated places in Dana County